Connecticut's 94th House of Representatives district elects one member of the Connecticut House of Representatives. It encompasses parts of Hamden and New Haven. It has been represented by Democrat Robyn Porter since 2015.

List of representatives

Recent elections

2020

2018

2016

2014

2014 special

2012

References

94